ASD Koa Bosco is an amateur football club based in Rosarno, Italy.

History 
The club was founded in 2013 and it's formed from African immigrants.

In May 2015, the club won its promotion to Seconda Categoria, the 8th level in Italian football system.

Current squad

References

External links
Club profile 

Football clubs in Calabria
Association football clubs established in 2013
2013 establishments in Italy